Canaan Heights is an unincorporated community in Tucker County, West Virginia, United States. Canaan Heights is located on West Virginia Route 32, south of Davis.

Unincorporated communities in Tucker County, West Virginia
Unincorporated communities in West Virginia